Anna Marejková (married name Krausová, born 24 October 1933) is a Slovak gymnast. She competed for Czechoslovakia in seven events at the 1956 Summer Olympics.

References

External links
 
 

1933 births
Living people
Slovak female artistic gymnasts
Olympic gymnasts of Czechoslovakia
Gymnasts at the 1956 Summer Olympics
People from Čadca District
Sportspeople from the Žilina Region